Campamento is an administrative neighborhood of Madrid belonging to the district of Latina.

Wards of Madrid
Latina (Madrid)